Emerald Fracture Zone is an undersea fracture zone running the distance from the southwest corner of the Campbell Plateau to the northern tip of Iselin Bank. The name was proposed by Dr. Steven C. Cande of the Scripps Institution of Oceanography for the vessel Emerald, which traversed this region in 1821, and was approved by the Advisory Committee for Undersea Features in June 1997.

References 

Geology of the Southern Ocean
Ross Dependency